Associated Press v. United States, 326 U.S. 1 (1945), was a United States Supreme Court case on U.S. antitrust law.

Facts
The Associated Press (AP) had prohibited member newspapers from selling or providing news (whether that news was supplied by the AP, or was authored by the member newspaper - called "spontaneous" news) to nonmember organizations as well as making it very difficult for nonmember newspapers to join the AP.

Originally there were three separate cases (Associated Press et al. v. U.S., Tribune Company et al. v. U.S. and U.S. v. Associated Press et al.) that were joined into one when heard at the Supreme Court.

Judgment
The Supreme Court held that Associated Press had violated the Sherman Act. The bylaws of AP at that time, as written, constituted restraint of trade. The fact that AP had not achieved a complete monopoly was irrelevant. The First Amendment did not excuse newspapers from violating the Sherman Antitrust Act. News, traded between states, counts as interstate commerce, and thus makes the issue relevant for the Sherman Antitrust Act. Finally, Freedom of the press from governmental interference under the First Amendment does not sanction repression of that freedom by private interests (326 U.S. 20).

See also
US antitrust law
 International News Service v. Associated Press (1918) - a copyright Supreme Court case

Notes

External links
 

United States Supreme Court cases
United States Supreme Court cases of the Stone Court
United States antitrust case law
1945 in United States case law
Associated Press